Cerma cora, the owl-eyed bird dropping moth, cora moth or Himalayan clematis moth, is an owlet moth (family Noctuidae). The species was first described by Jacob Hübner in 1818. It is found in North America.

The MONA or Hodges number for Cerma cora is 9061.

References

Further reading

External links

Acronictinae
Articles created by Qbugbot
Moths described in 1818